The following is a list of notable people presently or previously associated with the city of Philadelphia, Pennsylvania:

Academia

Joseph Addison Alexander (1809–1860), former clergyman and biblical scholar
E. Digby Baltzell (1915–1996), former sociologist, author, and professor at the University of Pennsylvania
Ellen Bass (born 1947), professor, poet, and author
Leon Bass (1925–2015), former educator and Benjamin Franklin High School principal
Aaron Beck (1921–2021), former psychiatrist, inventor of cognitive therapy, and Penn School of Medicine professor
Algernon Sydney Biddle (1847–1891), former lawyer and Penn Law School professor
Ray Birdwhistell (1918–1994), former anthropologist, University of Pennsylvania professor, and inventor of kinesics
Atherton Blight (1834–1909), former lawyer, businessperson, author, diarist, philanthropist, and Art Club of Philadelphia founding member
Alfred Bloom, linguist, professor, and Swarthmore College president
Francis Bohlen (1868–1942), former Penn Law School professor
Derek Bok (born 1930), lawyer, former Harvard Law School dean, and former Harvard University president
Lisa Bowleg, George Washington University social psychology professor
Ruby Chappelle Boyd (born 1919), former librarian
David D. Burns (born 1942), psychiatrist, author, Penn School of Medicine psychiatry professor
Noam Chomsky (born 1928), linguist, Far-left political activist, anarchist, and professor
Gordon Clark (1902–1985), former Christian theologian and professor
C. Everett Coop (1916–2013), former U.S. Surgeon General
Leda Cosmides (born 1957), psychologist, helped develop evolutionary psychology field
Philip D. Curtin (1922–2009), former Africa historian on Atlantic slave trade
 Steven Drizin, lawyer and professor
Drew Gilpin Faust (born 1947), historian, University of Pennsylvania administrator, and Harvard University president
R. Buckminster Fuller (1895–1983), former architect, systems theorist, author, University of Pennsylvania design professor
Andrew Gelman (born 1965), Columbia University professor, statistics and political science
Gaylord P. Harnwell (1903–1982), former University of Pennsylvania professor and president
Earl G. Harrison (1899–1955), former Penn Law School dean and former INS commissioner
Marc Lamont Hill (born 1978), professor, journalist, activist, and BET News correspondent
Agnes Irwin (1841–1914), former Agnes Irwin School founder and first dean of Radcliffe College
Seymour S. Kety (1915–2000), former neuroscientist and schizophrenia researcher
Lawrence Klein (1920–2013), former economist, Nobel laureate, University of Pennsylvania economics professor
Byard Lancaster (1942–2012), former avant-garde jazz saxophonist and flutist
Alain LeRoy Locke (1885–1954), former writer, philosopher, educator, and first African-American Rhodes Scholar
Margaret Mead (1901–1978), former cultural anthropologist and author
William Augustus Muhlenberg (1796–1877), considered father of parochial schools
John Pittenger (1930–2009), former lawyer, academic, and former Pennsylvania House of Representatives member
Philip Rieff (1922–2006), former sociologist, cultural critic, and University of Pennsylvania professor
Louis B. Schwartz (1913–2003), former University of Pennsylvania Law School law professor
Dora Adele Shoemaker (1873-1962), educator, writer
Jacob Soll (born 1968), historian and MacArthur Fellow
Lawrence H. Summers (born 1954), economist, former U.S. Secretary of the Treasury and Harvard University president
Howard M. Temin (1934–1994), former Nobel Prize co-laureate in physiology or medicine
Cornelius Van Til (1895–1987), former Christian theologian, professor, originator of modern presuppositional apologetics
Lawrence Venuti (born 1953), translation theorist and translation historian
Andrew Weil (born 1942), celebrity doctor and alternative medicine advocate
Gayraud Wilmore (1921–2020), former writer, historian, ethicist, educator, and theologian
Walter E. Williams (1936–2020), former economist, commentator, and academic
Harris Wofford (1926–2019), former Peace Corps director, Bryn Mawr College president, U.S. Senator appointee
 Bernard Wolfman (1924–2011), former University of Pennsylvania Law School law professor and dean
Josh Wurman (born 1960), meteorologist on Storm Chasers

Art and architecture

Julian Abele (1881–1950), former architect who contributed to the design of over 400 buildings
Robb Armstrong (born 1962), African American cartoonist, creator of Jump Start
Edmund Bacon (1910–2005), urban planner, architect, educator, and author
Bill Bamberger (born 1956), documentary photographer and photojournalist
Albert C. Barnes (1872–1951), former creator of the Barnes Collection of Art and Argyrol inventor
Cecilia Beaux (1855–1942), former portrait painter
William Bell (1830–1910), photographer
Alexander Calder (1898–1976), former sculptor
Alexander Milne Calder (1846–1923), former sculptor
Alexander Stirling Calder (1870–1945), former sculptor
Mary Cassatt (1844–1926), former impressionist painter and printmaker
Florence Van Leer Earle Coates (1850–1927), former poet
Robert Crumb (born 1943), underground comics artist, writer
Heather Dewey-Hagborg (born 1982), information artist and bio-hacker
Thomas Eakins (1844–1916), former realist painter, photographer, sculptor, Pennsylvania Academy of Fine Arts professor
Frank Heyling Furness (1839–1912), former architect who designed over 600 buildings
Sonia Gechtoff (1926–2018), former abstract expressionist painter
Ginger Gilmour (born 1949), sculptor and first wife of Pink Floyd guitarist David Gilmour
Phoebe Gloeckner (born 1960), cartoonist, illustrator, painter, novelist
Elizabeth Shippen Green (1871–1954), former children's books illustrator
Donelson Hoopes (1932–2006), former art historian
Ian Hornak (1944–2002), former draughtsman, painter, and printmaker
Amy Ignatow (born 1977), illustrator, cartoonist, and author
Louis Kahn (1901–1974), former architect
Bil Keane (1922–2011), former cartoonist, The Family Circus
Walt Kelly (1913–1973), former cartoonist, Pogo
Henry P. McIlhenny (1910–1986), former art and antique connoisseur, philanthropist, curator, and Philadelphia Museum of Art chairman
John Moran (1831–1902), former photographer and artist 
Alice Neel (1900–1984), former painter
Albert Newsam (1809–1864), born deaf and former artist
Linda Nochlin (1931–2017), former feminist art historian and Bryn Mawr College professor
Martin Nodell (1915–2006), former comic book artist and creator of the original Green Lantern
Charles Willson Peale (1741–1827), former artist and progenitor of the Peale family of American artists
William H. Rau (1855–1920), former photographer]
Seymour Remenick (1923–1999), former artist
 Elizabeth Wentworth Roberts (1871–1927), former painter and founder of Concord Art Association
Carolee Schneemann (1939–2019), former visual experimental artist on sexuality and gender
Mary B. Schuenemann (1898–1992), former painter
Denise Scott Brown (born 1931), architect, planner, writer, and educator
Sarai Sherman (1922–2013), former painter and sculptor
Grover Simcox (1867–1966), former illustrator, naturalist, and polymath
Jessie Wilcox Smith (1863–1935), former illustrator
Willi Smith (1948–1987), former fashion designer
Zoe Strauss (born 1970), photographer
William Strickland (1788–1854), former architect and civil engineer 
Thomas Sully (1783–1872), former portrait painter of national political leaders
Henry Ossawa Tanner (1859–1937), one of first African-American painters
Daniel Traub (born 1971), photographer and filmmaker
Horace Trumbauer (1868–1938), former architect
Robert Venturi (1925–2018), former architect
Thomas Ustick Walter (1804–1887), former architect and American Institute of Architects co-founder and president
Andrew Wyeth (1917–2009), former visual artist
Jamie Wyeth (born 1946), painter 
N.C. Wyeth (1882–1945), former artist and illustrator
Lily Yeh (born 1941), artist

Business

Frank Baldino Jr. (1953–2010), former pharmacologist, scientist, and Cephalon co-founder
John C. Bogle (1929–2019), former investor, money manager, and Vanguard founder
Amar Bose (1929–2013), former founder and chairman, Bose
David L. Cohen (born 1955), senior executive vice president and chief lobbyist for Comcast, former chief of staff to Philadelphia Mayor, U.S. ambassador to Canada nominee
Pat Croce (born 1954), entrepreneur, Philadelphia 76ers executive and part-owner, author, and television personality
George Dashnau (1923–2001), former advertising executive who started first mail order delivery service to supply human skulls
Charles Henry Davis (1865–1951), former businessperson, civil engineer, philanthropist; founded World Peace Movement
Warren Lyford DeLano (1972–2009), former advocate for increased open sourcing and PyMol creator
George H. Earle Jr. (1856–1928), former attorney 
Maria Anna Fisher (1819–1911), former African American baker, entrepreneur, and philanthropist
Kenneth Frazier (born 1954), Merck & Co. chief executive officer
A. O. Granger (Arthur Otis Granger; 1846–1914), former industrialist and soldier
Albert M. Greenfield (1887–1967), former local realty magnate, philanthropist, and political activist
Solomon R. Guggenheim (1861–1949), former Yukon Gold Company founder and philanthropist who established Solomon R. Guggenheim Foundation and Solomon R. Guggenheim Museum
Richard Hayne (born 1947), Urban Outfitters founder and chief executive officer
Michael Johns (born 1964), healthcare executive and former White House presidential speechwriter
Eldridge R. Johnson (1867–1945), former Victor Talking Machine Company founder
Tom Knox, UnitedHealthcare of Pennsylvania chief executive officer and former Philadelphia mayoral candidate
John Leamy (1757–1839), former Spanish Empire trade pioneer
J. Howard Marshall (1905–1995), former oil businessman, Koch Industries stakeholder, husband of Anna Nicole Smith
George Meade (1741–1808), former merchant
Richard W. Meade (1778–1828), former merchant and art collector
Samuel Meeker (1763–1831), former merchant 
Jim Murray, Ronald McDonald House Charities co-founder and former Philadelphia Eagles general manager
Joel Myers (born 1939), AccuWeather founder, chairman, and chief executive officer
Pat Olivieri (1910–1970), former founder of Pat's King of Steaks and reputed creator of the cheesesteak
William S. Paley (1901–1990), former CBS chief executive
Randal Pinkett (born 1971), entrepreneur and The Apprentice 4 winner
Felix Rappaport (1952–2018), former Foxwoods Resort and Casino chief executive officer
Lynda Resnick (born 1943), co-owner of Roll International, which owns POM Wonderful, FIJI Water, and Teleflora
Brian L. Roberts (born 1959), Comcast Corporation chairman and chief executive officer
Michael G. Rubin (born 1972), Kynetic founder and chief executive officer, Philadelphia 76ers part owner, and GSI Commerce founder and former chief executive officer
Stephen A. Schwarzman (born 1947), The Blackstone Group founder and chief executive officer
Ed Snider (1933–2016), former Comcast Spectacor chairman
Justus Strawbridge (1838–1911), former department store founder
Brian Tierney (born 1957), The Philadelphia Inquirer publisher
John Wanamaker (1838–1922), former department store founder
Walter E. Williams (1936–2020), former economist, commentator, and academic
James Hood Wright (1836–1894), former banker, financier, and corporate director, associate of J. P. Morgan and Thomas Edison
William Wrigley Jr. (1861–1932), former Wm. Wrigley Jr. Company founder

Criminals
Sydney Biddle Barrows (born 1952), escort service proprietor known as "The Mayflower Madam"
Antuan Bronshtein, convicted murderer, reputed Russian Mafia associate
Angelo Bruno (1910–1980), former Philadelphia crime family boss
Legs Diamond (1897–1931), former nemesis of mobster Dutch Schultz known as the "clay pigeon of the underworld"
Ira Einhorn (1940–2020), former environmental and anti-war activist, convicted murderer, and speaker at first Earth Day event in Philadelphia
Mary Jane Fonder (1942–2018), former convicted murderer of Rhonda Smith
Kermit Gosnell (born 1941), convicted of 21 felony counts of illegal late-term abortion
Gary Heidnik (1943–1999), former convicted murderer
Philip Leonetti (born 1953), underboss of Philadelphia crime family and government informant
Nicodemo Scarfo (1929–2017), former mafioso and head of Scarfo crime family

Film, television, and theater

A–K

Joe Augustyn, writer and producer
Kevin Bacon (born 1958), actor and half of The Bacon Brothers
Jim Bailey (1938–2015), former singer, film, television, and stage actor
Chuck Barris (1929–2017), former actor, composer, writer, director, producer, and game show host
Ethel Barrymore (1879–1959), former actress
John Barrymore (1882–1942), former actor
Lionel Barrymore (1878–1954), former actor, Mr. Potter in Frank Capra's It's a Wonderful Life
Eddie Barth (1931–2010), former actor and voiceover artist
Jules Bass (born 1935), director and composer
Laurie Beechman (1953–1998), former Broadway singer and actress
Willam Belli (born 1982), actor, drag queen, model, and recording artist
Maria Bello (born 1967), actress and writer
Ed Bernard (born 1939), actor
John Biddle (1925–2008), former yachting cinematographer and lecturer
Edward Binns (1916–1990), former actor
Joey Bishop (1918–2007), former entertainer
Danny Bonaduce (born 1959), actor
David Boreanaz (born 1969), actor
Jim Boyd (1933–2013), former actor
Peter Boyle (1935–2006), former actor
El Brendel (1890–1964), former vaudeville comedian and actor
David Brenner (1936–2014), former stand-up comedian, actor, and author
Richard Brooks (1912–1992), former screenwriter, film director, novelist, and film producer
Matt Bush (born 1986), actor, Adventureland
Eugene Byrd, (born 1975),  actor 
Michael Callan (1935-2022), former actor
Gia Marie Carangi (1960–1986), former supermodel
Joan Carroll (born 1932), coloratura soprano
Dick Clark (1929–2012), former host, American Bandstand and Dick Clark's New Year's Rockin' Eve, game show host, and producer
Bessie Clayton (1875–1948), former Broadway, vaudeville, and burlesque specialty dancer and choreographer
Imogene Coca (1908–2001), former actress and comedian
Nathan Cook (1950–1988), former actor
Bradley Cooper (born 1975), actor
Bill Cosby (born 1937), comedian, actor, and author
David Crane (born 1957), writer and producer 
Broderick Crawford (1911–1986), former actor
Susan Webb Cushman (1822–1859), former stage actress
Blythe Danner (born 1943), actress
Mildred Davis (1901–1969), former actress
Bruce Davison (born 1946), actor
John de Lancie (born 1948), actor
Francis De Sales (1912–1988), former actor
Kim Delaney (born 1961), actress
Kat Dennings (born 1986), actress
Curly Joe DeRita (1909–1993), former comedian, actor, and member of The Three Stooges
John Doman (born 1945), actor, The Wire
Mike Douglas (1920–2006), former singer and television talk show host
Gary Dourdan (born 1966), actor
Rel Dowdell, filmmaker
Ja'net Dubois (c. 1932–2020), former actress and singer
Cheryl Dunye (born 1966), director, writer, and producer
Kevin Eubanks (born 1957), musician and leader of The Tonight Show Band
Lola Falana (born 1942), dancer and actress
Norman Fell (1924–1998), former actor
Tina Fey (born 1970), actress and comedian
W. C. Fields (1880–1946), former actor and comedian
Mademoiselle Fifi (1890-1982), former dancer 
Larry Fine (1902–1975), former comedian, actor, and member of The Three Stooges
Linda Fiorentino (c. 1958), actress
Kate Flannery (born 1964), actress
Jeremy Gable (born 1982), playwright and game designer
John Gallaudet (August 23, 1903 - November 5, 1983), former actor
Ralph Garman (born 1964), actor and radio personality
Janet Gaynor (1906–1984), former actress
Richard Gere (born 1949), actor
Todd Glass (born 1964), comedian
Adam F. Goldberg (born 1976), television and film producer
Robert X. Golphin (born 1982), actor and filmmaker
Kate Gosselin (born 1975), reality television personality, Jon and Kate Plus Eight
Bruce Graham (1925–2010), former playwright
Seth Green (born 1974), actor
Grayson Hall (1922–1985), former television, film, and stage actress
Chief Halftown (1917–2003), former children's television personality
Veronica Hamel (born 1943), actress and model
Kevin Hart (born 1979), comedian and actor
Rodney Harvey (1967-1998), former actor
Sherman Hemsley (1938–2012), former actor
Emmaline Henry (1928–1979), former actress, I Dream of Jeannie
Marc Lamont Hill (born 1978), television host
Tigre Hill, producer and director
Paul Hipp (born 1963), actor, musician, and producer
Wendell Holland (born 1984), Survivor: Ghost Island winner
Billie Holiday (1915–1959), former singer
Kevin Hooks (born 1958), actor and director
Abby Huntsman (born 1986), co-host of The View
Mark Indelicato (born 1994), actor, singer (Justin Suarez on Ugly Betty)
Abbi Jacobson (born 1984), actress, comedian, and co-creator of Broad City
Barry Jenner (1941–2016), former actor
Clark Johnson (born 1954), actor and director
Nicole Kassell (born 1972), director and writer
George Kelly (1887–1974), former playwright, screenwriter, director, and actor
Grace Kelly (1929–1982), former actress and Princess of Monaco
Michael Kelly (born 1969), actor
Irvin Kershner (1923–2010), former director, The Empire Strikes Back
Taylor Kinney (born 1981), actor, Vampire Diaries and Chicago Fire
Jack Klugman (1922–2012), former actor, The Odd Couple, Quincy, M.E., and You Again?

L-Z

Patti LaBelle (born 1944), R&B and soul musician, actress, and entrepreneur
Michael Landon (1936–1991), former actor, producer, and director
Mario Lanza (1921–1959), former singer and actor
Stan Lathan (born 1945), film producer, television producer, and director
Andrew Lawrence (born 1988), actor
Joey Lawrence (born 1976), actor
Matthew Lawrence (born 1980), actor
Raw Leiba (born 1975), actor, stuntman, and sports model
Aaron Levinson, producer, musician
Brooke Lewis (born 1975), actress, producer and television personality
Shari Lewis (1933–1998), former children's television personality 
Gene London (1931–2020), former artist and local children's television personality
Lisa Lopes (1971–2002), former rapper, singer, songwriter, record producer, and dancer
Sidney Lumet (1924–2011), former film director
David Lynch (born 1946), film director
Jeanette MacDonald (1903–1965), former actress and singer
Stephen Macht (born 1942), actor
Abby Mann (1927–2008), former film writer and producer
Melanie Mayron (born 1952), actress
Adam Mazer, writer and Emmy winner
Bob McAllister (1935–1998), former children's television personality
Andrea McArdle (born 1963), singer, actress, Broadway's original Annie
Joan McCracken (1917–1961), former dancer and actress
Paul McCrane (born 1961), actor and musician
Rob McElhenney (born 1977), actor and creator of It's Always Sunny in Philadelphia
Andrew Repasky McElhinney (born 1978), film director, writer, Museum of Modern Art artist
Adam McKay (born 1968), director and writer
Mary Lou Metzger (born 1950), singer, The Lawrence Welk Show
David Mirkin (born 1955), writer and director
Silas Weir Mitchell (born 1969), actor
Katherine Moennig (born 1977), actress
Kelly Monaco (born 1976), model and actress
Natalie Nevins (1925–2010), former singer, The Lawrence Welk Show
J. J. North (born 1964), actress
Clifford Odets (1906–1963), former playwright, director, and screenwriter
Leslie Odom Jr. (born 1981), actor and singer
Ana Ortiz (born 1971), actress, Hilda Suarez on Ugly Betty
Daphne Oz (born 1986), author, television host on The Chew
Holly Robinson Peete (born 1964), actress
Lisa Peluso (born 1964), actress, Saturday Night Fever
Gervase Peterson (born 1969), contestant, original season of Survivor
Teddy Pendergrass (1950–2010), former R&B and soul musician, lead singer for Harold Melvin & the Blue Notes
Robert Picardo (born 1953), actor
Noam Pitlik (1932–1999), former actor, television director, and producer
Jack Polito (born 1941), animator
Jon Polito (1950–2016), former actor, Miller's Crossing
Joe Renzetti, musician, Oscar-winning film composer, The Buddy Holly Story
Adele Ritchie (1874–1930), former singer
Matt Robinson (1937–2002), former Sesame Street actor
James Rolfe (born 1980), creator and star of Angry Video Game Nerd internet series and film director
Lisa Roma (1892–1965), former operatic soprano and music educator
J. D. Roth (born 1968), actor and game show host
Bob Saget (1956–2022), former actor, comedian, and game show host
Mathew St. Patrick (born 1968), actor
Diane Salinger (born 1951), actress
Camillia Sanes, actress, The Shield
Jessica Savitch (1947–1983), former local and national news broadcaster, NBC
Bill Scott (1920–1985), former voice actor, voice of Bullwinkle J. Moose, Mr. Peabody, and Dudley Do-Right
Vivienne Segal (1897–1992), former actress
Susan Seidelman (born 1952), film director, television director, Desperately Seeking Susan and Sex and the City
Craig Shoemaker (born 1962), stand-up comedian and film and television producer
Jimmy Shubert, stand-up comedian
M. Night Shyamalan (born 1970), film director, The Sixth Sense and Signs
Penny Singleton (1908–2003), former radio, film, and voice actress
Jack Thomas Smith (born 1969), horror filmmaker
Toukie Smith (born 1952), model and actress
Will Smith (born 1968), actor, hip-hop recording artist, half of the duo DJ Jazzy Jeff & The Fresh Prince, record producer, four time Grammy-winner
David Smyrl (1935–2016), former actor and television writer, Sesame Street 
Harry Snodgrass (born 1963), sound designer, supervisor, and editor, Alien 3, Napoleon Dynamite, Hot Shots! Part Deux, Robin Hood Men in Tights
Tom Snyder (1936–2007), former news and entertainment personality, NBC
Sally Starr (1923–2013), former children's television personality
Joey Stefano (1968–1994), former dancer, actor, and gay porn star
Parker Stevenson (born 1952), actor
Charles Stone III (born 1966), film director and creator of Budweiser's "Whassup?" advertising campaign
Holland Taylor (born 1943), actress
Teller (born 1948), magician and half of Penn & Teller
Frank Tinney (1878–1940), former vaudeville comedian 
Paul F. Tompkins (born 1968), actor and comedian
Jean Vander Pyl (1919–1999), former actress, voice of Wilma Flintstone and Rosie the Robot Maid
Tom Verica (born 1964), actor
Nancy Walker (1922–1992), former actress and director
Brendan Walter (born 1986), actor, director, and guitarist
Bruce Walsh, playwright
Jeff Ward (born 1986), actor
Wee Willie Webber (1929–2010), former local radio and television personality
John Sylvester White (1919–1988), former television actor
Karen Malina White (born 1965), actress
Nafessa Williams, actress
Kenya D. Williamson, actress and screenwriter
Thomas F. Wilson (born 1959), actor and stand-up comic
Danny Woodburn (born 1964), actor and comedian
Ed Wynn (1886–1966), former actor and comedian, Uncle Albert in Walt Disney's Mary Poppins
John Zacherle (1918–2016), former actor, producer, and television horror host

Historical figures

David Hayes Agnew (1818–1892), former surgeon and teacher
Robert Aitken (1734–1802), former publisher of first Bible in North America
Louisa May Alcott (1832–1888), novelist
Andrew Allen (1740–1825), former delegate to Continental Congress
Harrison Allen (1841–1897), former anatomist and physician
Joseph Anderson (1757–1837), former United States Senator
Mary Stevens Beall (1854–1917), historian, writer, librarian
Charles John Biddle (1819–1873), former U.S. House of Representatives member
Edward Biddle (1738–1779), American Founding Father, soldier, lawyer, statesman, and delegate to Continental Congress
Francis Biddle (1886–1968), former U.S. Solicitor General, U.S. Attorney General, and Nuremberg trials principal judge
Nicholas Biddle (1786–1844), former financier and Second Bank of the United States president
Nicholas Biddle (1750–1778), Continental Navy original captain
Richard Biddle (1796–1847), former U.S. House of Representatives member
John C. Bowers (1811–1873), former entrepreneur, organist, and vestryman, and founding member of first Grand United Order of Odd Fellows
Thomas Bowers (c. 1823–1885), former concert artist
Ed Bradley (1941–2006), former CBS News radio journalist and television journalist
Henry "Box" Brown (c.1815–1897), abolitionist who escaped to freedom by arranging to have himself mailed in crate to abolitionists in Philadelphia
William C. Bullitt, Jr. (1891–1967), former diplomat who conducted special mission to negotiate with Vladimir Lenin on behalf of the Paris Peace Conference and first U.S. ambassador to Soviet Union and U.S. ambassador to France during World War II. 
Bebe Moore Campbell (1950–2006), former author, journalist, and teacher
Samuel Carpenter (1649–1714), first Pennsylvania Treasurer and deputy governor to William Penn
Octavius Valentine Catto (1839–1871), former educator, civil rights activist, and baseball player
Emilie Davis (1839–1889), former writer who kept American Civil War diary
Emma V. Day (1853–1895), former missionary to Liberia
Marguerite de Angeli (1889–1987), former author and illustrator
Branson DeCou (1892-1941), photographer and traveler
Harriet Schneider French (1824–1906), former physician and temperance movement activist
Henry George (1839–1897), former political economist and author, inspired economic philosophy known as Georgism
T. Adelaide Goodno (1858-1931), social reformer
Charlotte Forten Grimké (1837–1914), former abolitionist, poet, and educator
Benjamin Guggenheim (1865–1912), former businessman who died aboard the RMS Titanic
Thomas Hall (1834-1911), former inventor, mechanic, patent attorney. Invented the first portable typewriter.
John von Sonnentag de Havilland (1826–1886), former American officer of arms in England
A. Leon Higginbotham Jr. (1928–1998), former Kerner Commission commissioner, U.S. Court of Appeals for the Third Circuit judge, and Presidential Medal of Freedom recipient
John A. Hostetler (1918–2001), former author, educator, and Amish and Hutterite scholar
Rebecca Jones (1739-1818), former Quaker minister and educator
Grace Kelly (1929–1982), former princess of Monaco and actress
George Lippard (1822–1854), former novelist, journalist, playwright, social activist, and labor organizer
Alain LeRoy Locke (1885–1954), former writer, Harlem Renaissance figure, and first African American Rhodes Scholar
Henry C. McCook (1837–1911), former entomologist, clergyman, author, and Philadelphia city flag designer
Joseph McKenna (1843–1926), former U.S. Supreme Court associate justice, U.S. Attorney General, and U.S. House of Representatives member
Thomas Mifflin (1744–1800), Continental Army major general, fifth president of U.S. Congress, first Pennsylvania governor, and Founding Father
Anna Balmer Myers (1884–1972), former author
Robert N. C. Nix Jr. (1928–2003), former chief justice, Supreme Court of Pennsylvania
George W. Pepper (1867–1961), former attorney and U.S. Senator
William Pepper (1843–1898), former Free Library of Philadelphia founder and University of Pennsylvania provost
Philip Syng Physick (1768–1837), former physician known as father of American surgery
Marcus Aurelius Root (1808–1888), leading daguerreotypist and author
Betsy Ross (1752–1836), sewed first American flag known as the Betsy Ross flag
Benjamin Rush (1746–1813), former physician, politician, social reformer, humanitarian, educator, and Founding Father who signed the Declaration of Independence
Peggy Shippen (1760–1804), former to American Revolution traitor Benedict Arnold and highest-paid spy in the American Revolution
Leon Sullivan (1922–2001), former Baptist minister and social activist
Manuel Torres (1762–1822), first Colombian ambassador to the U.S.
Thomas Truxton (1755–1822), former American naval officer who rose to commodore
Frank J. Webb (1828–c. 1894), former novelist, poet, essayist, and writer

Media and literature

Isaac Ashmead (1790–1870), former printer who served in the War of 1812
Isaac Asimov (1920–1992), former science fiction author
Tony Auth (1942–2014), former editorial cartoonist and Pulitzer Prize and Herblock Prize winner 
Doug Banks (1958–2016), former nationally syndicated morning radio host
Leslie Esdaile Banks (1959–2011), former author
Donald Barthelme (1931–1989), former author
Stan and Jan Berenstain (1923–2005), former children's writing and illustration couple
Evelyn Berckman (1900–1978), former author
Ben Bova (1932–2020), former science fiction author
Mary D. R. Boyd (1809–1893), former children's book author
Ed Bradley (1941–2006), former journalist, 60 Minutes
Tony Bruno (born 1952), sports radio talk show host
Maxwell Struthers Burt (1882–1954), former novelist, poet, and author
Nathaniel Burt (1913–2003), former novelist, poet, composer, and author
Francesca Anna Canfield (1803–1833), former linguist and writer
Angelo Cataldi (born 1951), sports radio host
Renee Chenault-Fattah (born 1957), WCAU-TV news anchor and wife of U.S. Representative Chaka Fattah
Mary M. Cohen (1854–1911), former social economist, journalist, belletrist, and educator
Michael Connelly (born 1956), author
Benjamin De Casseres (1873–1945), former journalist, critic, essayist, and poet
Joseph Dennie (1768–1812), former essaysist, The Lay Preacher, and The Port Folio founding editor
Pete Dexter (born 1943), journalist, novelist, and National Book Award-winner
Catharine H. Esling (1812–1897), former hymn writer and poet
Courtney Friel (born 1980), KTLA-TV news anchor and reporter 
Charles Fuller (born 1939), playwright, Pulitzer Prize for Drama recipient, and Tony Award for Best Revival of a Play winner
Jim Gardner (born 1948), WPVI-TV news anchor
Mike Golic (born 1962), ESPN radio and television personality, former Philadelphia Eagles professional football player
David Goodis (1917–1967), former author
Terry Gross (born 1951), radio host and co-executive producer, Fresh Air
John Harvey (born 1951), radio and television personality
Aries Keck, author and radio reporter
Suzy Kolber (born 1964), television sportscaster
Andrea Kremer (born 1959), television sportscaster
Bob Lassiter (1945–2006), former left-wing radio host
Mark Levin (born 1957), lawyer, author, and radio personality
Rachel Levin (born 1995), YouTuber, and beauty guru
Jonathan Maberry (born 1958), suspense author, anthology editor, comic book writer, magazine feature writer, playwright, content creator, writing teacher and lecturer
Michelle Malkin (born 1970), political commentator
Chris Matthews (born 1945), NBC and MSNBC journalist and talk show host
Edith May (1827–1903), former writer and poet
Brian McDonough, medical editor, author, and physician
Jim McKay (1921–2008), former ABC sports journalist
Chris McKendry (born 1968), ESPN SportsCenter anchor
Larry Mendte (born 1957), KYW-TV news anchor
James A. Michener (1907–1997), former author
Aubertine Woodward Moore (1841–1929), former musician, writer, musical critic, translator, and lecturer
Christopher Morley (1890–1957), former novelist, short-story writer, and poet
Wesley Morris (born 1975), film critic and podcast host
Thom Nickels, author and journalist
Joe Queenan (born 1950), author and humorist
Matthew Quick (born 1973), author, The Silver Linings Playbook
Edgar Allan Poe (1809–1849), former novelist and short-story writer
Chaim Potok (1929–2002), former novelist and author, The Chosen and The Promise
Richard P. Powell (1908–1999), former novelist
Beasley Reece (born 1954), KYW-TV sports journalist and former professional football player, Philadelphia Eagles
Dave Roberts (born 1936), WPVI-TV meteorologist and former co-host, AM Philadelphia
Lisa Scottoline (born 1955), author and attorney
Peter Shellem (1960–2009), former Patriot News journalist who obtained release of five wrongfully convicted innocent people
Vai Sikahema (born 1962), WCAU-TV sports journalist and former professional football player, Philadelphia Eagles
Michael Smerconish (born 1962), WPHT-AM radio talk show host, Philadelphia Daily News columnist, and MSNBC political analyst
Anna Bustill Smith (1862–1945), author, genealogist, and suffragist
Stephen A. Smith (born 1967), ESPN radio and television personality, former Philadelphia Inquirer sports columnist
Arthur R. G. Solmssen (1928–2018), former attorney and novelist
Kristie Lu Stout (born 1974), journalist
Duane Swierczynski (born 1972), author and former Philadelphia City Paper editor
Omar Tyree (born 1969), author
Jeannette Walworth (1835–1918), former novelist and journalist
Ukee Washington (born 1958), KYW-TV news anchor
Jesse Watters (born 1978), political commentator and author
Jennifer Weiner (born 1970), author 
Kristen Welker (born 1976), television journalist and NBC News White House correspondent
Walt Whitman (1819–1892), former poet, essayist, and journalist
William Wharton (1925–2008), former author, Birdy

Military figures

Henry Harley "Hap" Arnold (1886–1950), former U.S. Army general, Air Force general, and World War I hero known as father of the U.S. Air Force
Albert Blithe (1923–1967), former U.S. Army paratrooper featured in Band of Brothers
Louis H. Carpenter (1839–1916), former Brigadier General, Medal of Honor recipient and veteran, Civil War, American Indian War, and Spanish–American War
George F. Good Jr. (1901–1991), former U.S. Marine Corps lieutenant general, commanded Marine defense battalions during World War II
William Guarnere (1923–2014), former U.S. Army staff sergeant featured in Band of Brothers
Alexander Haig (1924–2010), former U.S. military officer, diplomat, U.S. Secretary of State
Edward Heffron (1923–2013), former U.S. Army Private featured in Band of Brothers'
John Lawson (1837–1919), former U.S. Navy sailor and Medal of Honor recipient
George B. McClellan (1826–1885), former Union Army general and presidential candidate
H. R. McMaster (born 1962), major general and presidential chief of staff
John J. McVeigh (1921–1944), former Medal of Honor recipient for actions during Battle for Brest 
George Gordon Meade (1815–1872), former Union army general and victor at the Battle of Gettysburg
Thomas H. Neill (1826–1885), former Union Army general
John C. Pemberton (1814–1881), former Commander of Confederate defenders at Siege of Vicksburg
Charles Sutherland (1831–1895), former Surgeon General of U.S. Army

Music

Andrew Adgate (1762–1793), former musician, founder of music schools, and choir director
Al Alberts (1922–2009), former singer, The Four Aces
Marian Anderson (1897–1993), former opera singer and contralto
Frankie Avalon (born 1940), singer and actor
Baauer (born 1989), DJ and producer
Rachel Bagby, author, composer, singer, and composer
Bahamadia (born 1966), rapper known as Bahamadia
Pearl Bailey (1918–1990), former singer, dancer, and actress
Charli Baltimore (born 1974), hip hop artist
Samuel Barber (1910–1981), former composer, pianist, conductor, baritone, music educator, and composer
Len Barry (1942–2020), former recording star, vocalist, songwriter, lyricist, record producer, author, and poet
Toni Basil (born 1943), singer, "Mickey"
Diane Meredith Belcher (born 1960), concert organist, teacher, and church musician
Steve Berlin, (born 1955), keyboardist and saxophone player, Los Lobos
Emile Berliner (1851–1929), former inventor of the flat disc record, the gramophone, founder of Victor Talking Machine Company, and Gramophone Company
Frankie Beverly (born 1946), R&B singer and musician, founder and lead singer of Maze featuring Frankie Beverly
Charlie Biddle (1926–2003), former jazz bassist
Bilal (born 1979), neo-soul singer and musician
Cindy Birdsong (born 1939), founding member, Labelle, and replacement member, Diana Ross & the Supremes
Joe Bonsall (born 1948), country music singer and member of The Oak Ridge Boys
Dante Bucci (1980–2014), former handpan musician
Lil dicky (born 1988), rapper known as "Lil dicky"
Solomon Burke (c. 1936 or 1940–2010), former R&B singer
Uri Caine (born 1956), composer, arranger, and jazz pianist 
Cassidy (born 1982), rapper
Sarah Chang (born 1980), child prodigy violinist with major orchestras
Chubby Checker (born 1941), singer
Noam Chomsky (born 1928), progressive activist
Stanley Clarke (born 1951), bassist
Alice Cohen (born 1958), singer and songwriter known as Alice Desoto
John Coltrane (1926–1967), former jazz saxophonist
Norman Connors (born 1947), singer 
Tommy Conwell (born 1962), guitarist, songwriter, and performer
Cool C (born 1969), rapper
Jim Croce (1943–1973), former singer
James Darren (born 1936), singer and actor
Rick DeJesus (born 1983), lead singer, Adelitas Way
James DePreist (1936–2013), former orchestra conductor
Dieselboy (born 1972), drum and bass DJ and producer
Fred Diodati, lead singer, The Four Aces
Diplo (born 1978), DJ and producer
Bill Doggett (1916–1996), former jazz and R&B organist and pianist
Gail Ann Dorsey (born 1962), bassist
Charles Earland (1941–1999), former organist
Nathan East (born 1955), jazz, R&B, rock bass player, and vocalist
Kevin Eubanks (born 1957), jazz guitarist
Robin Eubanks (born 1955), jazz trombonist
Duane Eubanks (born 1969), jazz trumpeter
Eve (born 1978), rapper and actress
Fabian (born 1943), singer and actor
Nick Falcon (born 1968), guitarist, composer, lyricist, and singer
Sheila Ferguson (born 1947), singer, The Three Degrees
Wilhelmenia Fernandez (born 1949), opera singer and soprano
Rachelle Ferrell (born 1961), jazz vocalist
Eddie Fisher (1928–2010), former singer and actor
Sam Fogarino (born 1968), rock music drummer, Interpol
Freeway (born 1978), rapper
Kenny Gamble (born 1943), producer and co-founder, Philadelphia International Records
Melody Gardot (born 1985), jazz singer
Stan Getz (1927–1991), former jazz saxophonist
Benny Golson (born 1929), jazz saxophonist
Charlie Gracie (born 1936), rock singer
Gogi Grant (1924–2016), former singer, "The Wayward Wind"
Anthony Green (born 1982), singer, Saosin and Circa Survive
Vivian Green (born 1979), R&B singer
Daryl Hall (born 1946), singer and half of Hall & Oates duo
Joseph Hallman (born 1979), composer, arranger, singer, and producer
Rufus Harley (1936–2006), former jazz musician and first jazz musician to use Great Highland bagpipe as primary instrument
Robert Hazard (1948–2008), former new wave musician and composer
Albert Heath (born 1935), jazz drummer
Jimmy Heath (1926–2020), former jazz saxophonist
Percy Heath (1923–2005), former jazz bassist
Leon Huff (born 1942), producer and co-founder, Philadelphia International Records
Phyllis Hyman (1949–1995), former R&B and jazz vocalist
DJ Jazzy Jeff (born 1965), hip-hop DJ, neo-soul producer, and half DJ Jazzy Jeff & the Fresh Prince duo
Joan Jett (born 1958), rock musician
Philly Joe Jones (1923–1985), former jazz drummer
Kitty Kallen (1921–2016), former pop singer
Jason Karaban, singer and songwriter
Tom Keifer (born 1961), glam metal vocalist, Cinderella
Keith (born 1949), singer who wrote "98.6"
Bill Kenny (1914–1978), former singer 
Khia (born 1977), rapper
King Britt (born 1968), house DJ and producer
Kurupt (born 1972), rapper
Patti LaBelle (born 1944), R&B & soul singer and actress
Mario Lanza (1921–1959), former operatic singer
Lil Uzi Vert (born 1995), rapper and hip hop artist
Lynda Laurence (born 1949), part of Stevie Wonder's backup group The Third Generation and part of The Supremes
Amos Lee (born 1977), folk and blues singer
Lisa "Left Eye" Lopes (1971–2002), former member, TLC
Monie Love (born 1970), rapper and radio personality
Leonard MacClain (1899–1967), former theatre organist
Al Martino (1927–2009), former singer and actor, Johnny Fontane in The GodfatherPat Martino (1944–2021), former jazz guitarist
Barbara Mason (born 1947), R&B singer and composer
Christian McBride (born 1972), jazz bassist
Marian Anderson (1897–1993), former gospel singer
Marshmello (born 1992), DJ and producer
Meek Mill (born 1987), rapper
Lizzy McAlpine (born 1999), singer and songwriter.
Ms. Jade (born 1979), hip hop artist
Lee Morgan (1938–1972), former jazz trumpeter and composer
James Mtume (1946-2022), former R&B and jazz musician and founder of Mtume
Musiq Soulchild (born 1977), R&B and neo-soul singer
James E. Myers (1919–2001), former songwriter, actor, and co-writer of "Rock Around the Clock"
Marc Nelson (born 1971), R&B singer, Boyz II Men and Az Yet
Lobo Nocho (1919–1997), jazz singer
John Oates (born 1948), singer and half of Hall & Oates duo
Maurie Orodenker (1908–1993), former journalist, music critic, and advertising agency executive who coined the term "rock and roll"
Hugh Panaro (born 1964), tenor singer, Broadway and opera
Billy Paul (1934–2016), former Grammy Award-winning soul singer
Vinnie Paz (born 1977), rapper, founder of Jedi Mind Tricks and Army of the Pharaohs
Peedi Peedi (born 1977), rapper
Teddy Pendergrass (1950–2010), former R&B singer, Harold Melvin & the Blue Notes
Christina Perri (born 1986), singer
Vincent Persichetti (1915–1987), former composer and music educator
Pink (born 1979), R&B and rock music singer
Fayette Pinkney (1948–2009), former singer, The Three Degrees
Trudy Pitts (1932–2010), former jazz keyboardist
Princess Superstar (born 1971), hip hop performer
Questlove (born 1971), drummer, producer, DJ, writer, journalist, and photographer
Sun Ra (1914–1993), former jazz pianist and band leader
Danny Rapp (1941–1983), former singer, Danny & the Juniors
Joe Renzetti, guitarist and Oscar Award winner
Res, R&B singer
RJD2 (born 1976), producer
Paul Robeson (1898–1976), former singer, activist, attorney, and All-American collegiate athlete
PnB Rock (1991–2022) rapper
Jack Rose (1971–2009), former guitarist
Todd Rundgren (born 1948), musician, singer, songwriter, and producer
Bobby Rydell (born 1942-2022), former singer and actor
Santigold (born 1976), punk singer
John Sebastian (1914–1980), former classical harmonica player and composer
Danny Sembello (1963-2015), R&B singer, songwriter, record producer, and multi-instrumentalist
Michael Sembello (born 1954), R&B singer, guitarist, keyboardist, and songwriter
Schoolly D (born 1962), rapper
Jill Scott (born 1972), R&B and neo-soul singer
Shirley Scott (1934–2002), former organist 
Musiq Soulchild (born 1977), R&B and neo-soul singer
Dee Dee Sharp (born 1945), singer and actress
Gene Shay (1935–2020), former folk music musician
Oscar Shumsky (1917–2000), former violinist and conductor
Beanie Sigel (born 1974), rapper
Bunny Sigler (1941–2017), former R&B singer, multi-instrumentalist, composer, and producer
Steady B (born 1969), rapper
Jazmine Sullivan (born 1987), R&B and soul vocalist, 12-time Grammy Award nominee, and two-time BET Award-winner
William Takacs (born 1973), trumpet player
Tammi Terrell (1945–1970), former soul, R&B, and Motown singer
Russell Thompkins Jr. (born 1951), soul and R&B singer 
Tariq "Black Thought" Trotter (born 1973), lead MC and co-founder, The Roots
Robbie Tronco, DJ
Ira Tucker (1925–2008), former lead singer, The Dixie Hummingbirds
McCoy Tyner (1938–2020), former jazz pianist and composer, John Coltrane quartet 
Charlie Ventura (born 1916), tenor saxophonist and band leader 
Kurt Vile (born 1980), guitarist and vocalist
Lee Ving (born 1950), singer and songwriter, frontman of hardcore punk band Fear
Johannes von Trapp (born 1939), singer and member of Trapp Family
Evan Sewell Wallace (1982–2017), former singer, songwriter, and rapper known as "E-Dubble"
Clara Ward (1924–1973), former gospel singer
Grover Washington Jr. (1943–1999), former jazz saxophonist and founder of smooth jazz genre
Crystal Waters (born 1961), dance and house music singer
Ethel Waters (1896–1977), former blues singer and actress
André Watts (born 1946), pianist
Pamela Williams (born 1963), jazz saxophonist
Josh Wink (born 1970), DJ and electronic music producer
Karen Young (1951–1991), former disco singer

Politics

Leon Abbett (1836–1894), former New Jersey governor
Lynne Abraham (born 1941), Philadelphia district attorney
William Allen (1704–1780), former Philadelphia mayor
Chris Bartlett (born 1966), LGBT activist
Raj Bhakta (born 1975), Congressional candidate and contestant, The Apprentice Season 2Michael J. Bradley (1897–1979), former U.S. House of Representatives member
Winfield S. Braddock (1848–1920), former Wisconsin State Assembly member
Bob Brady (born 1945), member, U.S. House of Representatives, Philadelphia mayoral candidate, NBC Universal and Independence Blue Cross lobbyist
Raymond J. Broderick (1914–2000), former U.S. federal judge
William T. Cahill (1912–1996), former New Jersey governor
Ashton Carter (born 1954), physicist, Harvard University professor, and U.S. Secretary of Defense
Augusta Clark (1932–2013), former librarian, politician, lawyer, and second African-American woman to serve on Philadelphia City Council
Joseph S. Clark (1901–1990), former Philadelphia mayor and U.S. Senator
Mark B. Cohen (born 1949), member, Pennsylvania House of Representatives, Democratic leader of Pennsylvania House, and chairman, House Labor Relations Committee
Henry Conner (1837–died), former member, Wisconsin State Senate
George M. Dallas (1792–1864), former U.S. vice president
Richardson Dilworth (1898–1974), former attorney, Philadelphia district attorney, and Philadelphia mayor
Dwight E. Evans (born 1954), member, Pennsylvania House of Representatives and former Philadelphia mayoral candidate
George H. Earle Sr. (1823–1907), founder of the Republican Party, abolitionist, and lawyer who represented fugitive slaves
Chaka Fattah (born 1956), member, U.S. House of Representatives and former Philadelphia mayoral candidate
Douglas J. Feith (born 1953), Undersecretary of Defense and Iraq policy adviser
Tom Feeney (born 1958), Florida politician
James Forten (1766–1842), former African-American businessman, abolitionist leader, and sailmaker
Benjamin Franklin (1706–1790), Founding Father, polymath, writer, scientist, inventor, statesman, diplomat, printer, publisher, political philosopher
Shirley Franklin (born 1945), former Atlanta major
Mifflin Wistar Gibbs (1823–1915), former lawyer, judge, diplomat, and banker
W. Wilson Goode (born 1938), former Philadelphia mayor
W. Wilson Goode Jr. (born 1965), former Philadelphia City Council at-large member
Oscar Goodman (born 1939), attorney and former Las Vegas mayor
James P. Gourley, former Pennsylvania House of Representatives member
William H. Gray (1941–2013), former Baptist minister, former U.S. House of Representatives member, and former United Negro College Fund president
William J. Green III (born 1938), former Philadelphia major and U.S. House of Representatives member
Simon Guggenheim (1867–1941), former U.S. Senator and philanthropist
Alexander Haig (1924–2010), former U.S. Secretary of State and White House Chief of Staff
Richard Helms (1913–2002), former Central Intelligence Agency director
Charles W. Heyl (1857–1936), former businessman, fire chief, and politician
Michael Johns (born 1964), former White House presidential speechwriter
Joseph L. Kun (1882–1961), former judge, Philadelphia Court of Common Pleas
George Landenberger (1879–1936), former American Samoa governor
Frank J. Larkin (born 1955), U.S. Senate sergeant at arms
John J. McCloy (1895–1989), former Chase Manhattan Bank and Ford Foundation chairman, Assistant U.S Secretary of War during World War II, and Allies' high commissioner of Germany
Robert F. McDonnell (born 1954), former Virginia governor
Katie McGinty (born 1963), U.S. Senate nominee, chair, Council on Environmental Quality, and former chief of staff to Pennsylvania governor Tom Wolf
J. Whyatt Mondesire (1949–2015), former president, NAACP Philadelphia chapter
Cecil B. Moore (1915–1979), former Philadelphia city council member and civil rights activist
Patrick Murphy (born 1973), former member, U.S. House of Representatives
Benjamin Netanyahu (born 1949), former Prime Minister of Israel
Robert N.C. Nix Sr. (1898–1987), former member, U.S. House of Representatives
Michael A. Nutter (born 1957), former Philadelphia mayor and member, Philadelphia City Council
Dennis M. O'Brien (born 1952), former member, Pennsylvania House of Representatives and Pennsylvania House of Representatives speaker
Tony J. Payton Jr. (born 1981), former member, Pennsylvania House of Representatives
Boies Penrose (1860–1921), former U.S. Senator and party boss
Harriet Forten Purvis (1810–1875), abolitionist leader
Charles H. Ramsey (born 1950), former Philadelphia police commissioner
Samuel J. Randall (1828–1890), former U.S. House of Representatives member and Speaker of the House
Ed Rendell (born 1944), former Pennsylvania governor, Philadelphia mayor, and Philadelphia district attorney
Frank Rizzo (1920–1991), former Philadelphia mayor and police commissioner
John Robbins (1808–1880), former U.S. House of Representatives member
Allyson Schwartz (born 1948), member, U.S. House of Representatives
Thomas Smith (born 1805), former Indiana Supreme Court justice, Pennsylvania General Assembly member, and writer 
Arlen Specter (1930–2012), former U.S. Senator and Philadelphia district attorney
Ben Stahl (1915–1998), former labor leader and activist
John F. Street (born 1943), former Philadelphia mayor
Milton Street (born 1941), entrepreneur, former Pennsylvania state legislator, and Philadelphia City Council candidate
Norman Sussman (1905–1969), former Wisconsin state senator
Joel Barlow Sutherland (1792–1861), former member, U.S. House of Representatives
Al Taubenberger (born 1953), former Philadelphia mayoral candidate
John Timoney (1948–2016), former Philadelphia police commissioner and Miami police chief
Gregory Tony (born 1978), Sheriff of Broward County, Florida
C. Delores Tucker (1927–2005), former civil rights activist and Pennsylvania Secretary of State
Anna C. Verna (1931–2021), former Philadelphia City Council member and president
Charles A. Waters (1892–1972), Pennsylvania Auditor General, State Treasurer, and president judge of the Philadelphia County Court of Common Pleas
R. Seth Williams (born 1967), Philadelphia district attorney
Fernando Wood (1812–1881), former Mayor of New York

Sports

Chris Achuff (born 1975), defensive line coach, Syracuse University
John Abadie (1854–1905), former professional baseball player, Brooklyn Atlantics and Philadelphia Athletics
Cal Abrams (1924–1997), former professional baseball player, Baltimore Orioles, Brooklyn Dodgers, Chicago White Sox, Cincinnati Reds, and Pittsburgh Pirates
Chris Albright (born 1979), MLS defender, FC Cincinnati
Dick Allen (1942–2020), former professional baseball player, Chicago White Sox, Oakland Athletics, Los Angeles Dodgers, Philadelphia Phillies, and St. Louis Cardinals, National League Rookie of the Year, and seven-time All-Star
Doug Allison (1846–1916), first professional baseball player ever to use a baseball glove
Eddie Alvarez (born 1984), mixed martial artist, ONE Championship
Rubén Amaro Jr. (born 1965), former professional baseball player, general manager, and coach
Paul Arizin (1928–2006), former professional basketball player, Camden Bullets and Philadelphia Warriors
Charles Barkley (born 1963), former Philadelphia 76ers professional basketball player, NBA MVP, 11-time All-Star, and Naismith Memorial Basketball Hall of Fame member
Deion Barnes (born 1993), former professional football player, Kansas City Chiefs and New York Jets
Reds Bassman (1913–2010), former professional football player, Philadelphia Eagles
Bert Bell (1895–1959), founder of Philadelphia Eagles football team and former NFL commissioner
Barney Berlinger (1908–2002), former 1928 Summer Olympics decathlete
Mohini Bhardwaj (born 1978), former 2004 Summer Olympics gymnast
Tyrell Biggs (born 1960), former boxer, 1984 Summer Olympics gold medalist
Ed Blaney (born 1951), retired professional soccer player
Audrey Bleiler (1933–1975), former All-American Girls Professional Baseball League player, South Bend Blue Sox
 Chaim Bloom (born 1983), Boston Red Sox chief baseball officer
Thomas Brennan (1922–2003), former professional hockey player, Boston Bruins 
Charles Brewer (born 1969), former boxer and IBF super middleweight champion 
Derek Bryant (born 1971) former heavyweight boxer
Kobe Bryant (1978–2020), former professional basketball player and five-time NBA Finals champion
Michael Brooks (1958–2016), former professional basketball player
Roy Campanella (1921–1993), former professional baseball player, three-time National League Most Valuable Player
Wilt Chamberlain (1936–1999), former professional basketball player and two-time NBA champion
Ben Clime (1891–1973), former professional football player
Randall "Tex" Cobb (born 1950), former boxer and actor
Tim Cooney (born 1990), professional baseball player
Don Cohan (1930–2018), 1972 Olympic bronze medalist, sailing
Brian Cohen (born 1976), professional boxer
Julia Cohen (born 1989) professional tennis player
Steve Coleman (born 1950), former professional football player
Bobby Convey (born 1983), professional soccer player for the San Jose Earthquakes and the U.S. Men's National Soccer team
Tyrone Crawley (1958–2021), former boxer
Fran Crippen (1984–2010), former professional swimmer
Maddy Crippen (born 1980), swimmer in 2000 Olympics 
Ray Culp (born 1941), Phillies right-handed pitcher and runner-up to Dick Allen for National League Rookie of the Year
Steve Cunningham (born 1976), boxer and cruiserweight champion
Brandon Davies (born 1991), American-born Ugandan professional basketball player
Matthew "Super" DeLisi (born 2000), esports player
Ollie Dobbins (born 1941), football player
Buster Drayton (born 1952), former boxer and light middleweight (super welterweight) champion
Jon Drummond (born 1968), former track and field athlete, 1996 and 2000 Olympic medalist
Dave Dunaway (1945–2001), former professional football player
Angelo Dundee (1921–2012), former boxing trainer
Fred Dunlap (1859–1902), former professional baseball player
John Edelman (born 1935), former professional baseball player 
Gary Emanuel (born 1958), defensive line coach, Atlanta Falcons
Julius Erving (born 1950), Philadelphia 76ers 11-time All-Star, 2-time NBA champion, two-time ABA champion, Naismith Memorial Basketball Hall of Fame member
Jahri Evans (born 1983), former professional football player
 D'or Fischer (born 1981), Israeli-American basketball player, Israeli National League
 Craig Fitzgerald, professional football coach
Joe Flacco (born 1985), professional football player
Francine Fournier (born 1972), professional wrestling valet, Extreme Championship Wrestling
Joe Frazier (1944–2011), former boxer, 1964 Olympic gold medalist and former world heavyweight champion
Marvis Frazier (born 1960), boxer
Harry Fritz (1890–1974), former baseball player
Jim "Sandman" Fullington (born 1963), former professional wrestler, Extreme Championship Wrestling and WWE
Mark Gerban (born 1979), first world champion rower, Palestine
Eddie George (born 1973), former professional football player and Heisman Trophy winner
Kerry Getz (born 1975), professional skateboarder
Joey Giardello (1930–2008), former professional boxer and middleweight champion
Tom Gola (1933–2014), former professional basketball player, La Salle University men's basketball head coach, and Philadelphia mayoral candidate
Brent Grimes (born 1983), former professional football player
Randy Grossman (born 1952), former professional football player and four-time Super Bowl Champion
Mark Gubicza (born 1962), former professional baseball player 
Drew Gulak (born 1987), professional wrestler
Matt Guokas (born 1944), former professional basketball player and coach
Brendan Hansen (born 1981), Olympic swimmer
Eric Harding (born 1972), boxer
Marvin Harrison (born 1972), former professional football player
Kirk Hershey (1918–1979), former professional football player
Bill Holland (1907–1984), 1949 Indianapolis 500 winner and three-time second place finisher 
Bernard Hopkins (1965), former boxer and world middleweight champion
Demetrius Hopkins (1980), boxer 
Allen Iverson (born 1975), Philadelphia 76ers professional basketball player, 11-time All-Star, NBA MVP, Naismith Memorial Basketball Hall of Fame member
Michael Iaconelli (born 1972) professional bass angler and winner of 2003 Bassmaster Classic
Reggie Jackson (born 1946), former Hall of Fame baseball player
Judith Jamison (born 1943), dancer; choreographer, and artistic director, Alvin Ailey American Dance Theater
Joe Judge (born 1981), professional football head coach, New York Giants
 Gabe Kapler (born 1976), professional baseball player and manager
John B. Kelly Sr. (1889–1960), former triple Olympic gold medal winner, rowing
John B. Kelly Jr. (1927–1985), former champion rower
Florian Kempf (born 1956), former football player
Matt Kilroy (1866–1940), former professional baseball player
Sam Kimber (1854–1925), former professional baseball player
Bart King (1873–1965), former cricket bowler
Kenny Koplove (born 1993), former baseball player
Mike Koplove (born 1976), former professional baseball pitcher
Julian Krinsky, tennis player
Rick Lackman (1910–1990), former professional football player
Dave LaCrosse (born 1955), former professional player
Sonny Liston (c.1930–c. 1970), former boxer and world heavyweight champion
Tommy Loughran (1902–1982), former boxer and light heavyweight champion
Harry Luff (1856-1916), Major League Baseball player
John Macionis (1916–2012), former Olympic swimmer, 1936 silver medalist
Brooke Makler (1951–2010), former Olympic fencer
Paul Makler Jr. (born 1946), former Olympic fencer
Paul Makler Sr. (1920–2022), former Olympic fencer 
Donovan McNabb (born 1976), former professional football player, Philadelphia Eagles 
Dick McBride (1847–1916), former baseball player and manager
John McDermott (1891–1971), former professional golfer
Benny McLaughlin (1928–2012), former professional soccer player and member, U.S. Soccer Hall of Fame
Jake Metz (born 1991), football player
Levi Meyerle (1849–1921), former professional baseball player
Nate Miller (born 1963), former boxer and cruiserweight champion
Alvin Mitchell (born 1943), former football player
Tony Morgano (1913–1984), former boxer
Willie Mosconi (1913–1993), former professional billiards player
Matthew Saad Muhammad (1954–2014), former boxer and light heavyweight champion
Browning Nagle (born 1968), former professional football player
Jim O'Brien (born 1952), NBA coach
Vince Papale (born 1946), former professional football player, inspiration for the movie InvincibleKyle Pitts (born 2000), professional football player, Atlanta Falcons
Mike Powell (born 1963), former track and field athlete, 1988 and 1992 Olympic silver medalist and current long jump world record holder
Zahir Raheem (born 1976), boxer and 1996 Olympian
Jack Ramsay (1925–2014), former basketball coach, Saint Joseph's College men's team, NBA coach, general manager, television commentator, and Hall of Famer
Merrill Reese (born 1942), Philadelphia Eagles radio broadcaster
David Reid (born 1973), former boxer, 1996 Olympic gold medalist, light middleweight
Stevie Richards (born 1971), professional wrestler, Extreme Championship Wrestling and WWE
Robin Roberts (1926–2010), former Phillies right-handed pitcher, Cy Young Award recipient, and member of the Baseball Hall of Fame
Ivan Robinson (born 1971), boxer
Allen Rosenberg (1931–2013), former rower and rowing coach
Mike Schmidt (born 1949), former Phillies Golden Glove third baseman and member of Baseball Hall of Fame
Vic Seixas (born 1923), former tennis player
Kirk Shelmerdine (b 1958), former NASCAR driver and crew chief
Ed Sheridan (born 1957), retired professional soccer player
Steve Slaton (born 1986), NFL player
Gunboat Smith (1887–1974), former boxer turned actor and boxing referee
Frank Spellman (1922–2017), former Olympic champion weightlifter
David Starr (born 1991), professional wrestler
Harry Stovey (1856–1937), former professional baseball player
Joe Sugden (1870–1959), former professional baseball player
Eric Tangradi (born 1989), professional hockey player
Meldrick Taylor (born 1966), former boxer, 1984 Olympic gold medalist, welterweight and junior welterweight champion
Aaron Torres (born 1978), boxer and contestant on The Contender 2Najai Turpin (1981–2005), former boxer and contestant on The ContenderHarp Vaughan (1903–1978), former professional football player
Iosif Vitebskiy (born 1938), former Soviet/Ukrainian Olympic medalist and world champion fencer and fencing coach
John Waerig (born 1976), former professional football player
Steve Wagner (born 1967), former Olympic field hockey player
Bobby "Boogaloo" Watts (born 1949), former boxer
Charles Way (born 1972), former professional football player
Reece Whitley (born 2000), swimmer and former Sports Illustrated Kid of the Year
Erik Williams (born 1968), former professional football player, Dallas Cowboys
Ike Williams (1923–1994), former boxer and lightweight champion
Joe Williams (born 1942) former football player
Stevie Williams (born 1979), professional skateboarder
Brad Wanamaker (born 1989), professional basketball player, Boston Celtics
Ned Williamson (1857–1894), former professional baseball player
George Winslow (born 1963), former professional football player
Jimmy Young (1948–2005), former boxer

Philadelphia native basketball players
Ryan Arcidiacono (born 1994), professional basketball player, New York Knicks 
Mike Bantom (born 1951), former professional basketball player, Indiana Pacers, New York Nets, Philadelphia 76ers, Phoenix Suns, and Seattle Seahawks
Gene Banks (born 1959), former professional basketball player, Chicago Bulls and San Antonio Spurs
Joe "Jellybean" Bryant, former professional basketball player, Houston Rockets, Philadelphia 76ers, and San Diego Clippers
Kobe Bryant (1978–2020), former professional basketball player, Los Angeles Lakers
Rasual Butler (1979–2018), former professional basketball player
Tony Carr (born 1997), basketball player in the Israeli Premier Basketball League
Fred Carter (born 1945), NBA 
Wilt Chamberlain (1936–1999), former professional basketball player
Dionte Christmas (born 1986), NBA 
Bryan Cohen (born 1989), American-Israeli - Israel Basketball Premier League 
Mardy Collins (born 1984), NBA 
Dallas Comegys (born 1964), NBA 
Mark Davis (born 1960), NBL (Australia) – Adelaide 36ers
Wayne Ellington (born 1987), NBA 
Tyreke Evans (born 1989), NBA 
D'or Fischer (born 1981)
Eddie Griffin (1982–2007), former professional basketball player
Gerald Henderson Jr. (born 1987), NBA 
Rondae Hollis-Jefferson (born 1995), professional basketball player
De'Andre Hunter (born 1997), current NBA player for the Atlanta Hawks
Marc Jackson (born 1975), NBA 
Amile Jefferson (born 1993), NBA G League 
Wali Jones (born 1942), NBA
Bo Kimble (born 1966), NBA
Red Klotz (1920–2014), former American Basketball League basketball player 
 Howard Lassoff (1955–2013), former American-Israeli basketball player
 Ryan Lexer (born 1976), American-Israeli former basketball player, Israeli Basketball Premier League
Kyle Lowry (born 1986), NBA 
Aaron McKie (born 1972), NBA 
Cuttino Mobley (born 1975), NBA 
Earl Monroe (born 1944), NBA 
Marcus Morris (born 1989), NBA
Markieff Morris (born 1989), NBA 
Ronald "Flip" Murray (born 1979), NBA
Jameer Nelson (born 1982), NBA
Aaron Owens (born 1974), 
Red Rosan (1911–1976), former American Basketball League professional basketball player 
Malik Rose (born 1974), NBA 
John Salmons (born 1979), NBA 

Art Spector (1920–1987), former professional basketball player 
Dawn Staley (born 1970), WNBA
Dion Waiters (born 1991), NBA 
Rasheed Wallace (born 1974), NBA 
Hakim Warrick (born 1982), NBA
Mike Watkins (born 1995), professional basketball player, Antwerp Giants in the BNXT League
Maurice Watson (born 1993), Maccabi Rishon LeZion of the Israeli Basketball Premier League
Maalik Wayns (born 1991), NBA 
Alvin Williams (born 1974), NBA
Khalif Wyatt (born 1991), NBA G League

Other

Richard Allen (1760–1831), former African Methodist Episcopal Church bishop and abolitionist
Gloria Allred (born 1941), women's rights attorney
Hart O. Berg (1865–1941), former engineer and businessman
Anna Pierce Hobbs Bixby (c. 1810–c. 1870), former midwife, frontier doctor, dentist, herbologist, and scientist who discovered cause of milk sickness
Guion Bluford (born 1942), astronaut and first African-American in space
Frank Erdman Boston (1890-1960), former physician
Stanley Branche (1933–1992), former civil rights activist and Philadelphia night club owner
Pete Conrad (1930–1999), former astronaut, third man to walk on the Moon with Apollo 12
Percy Crawford (1902–1960), former clergyman and religious broadcaster
Wilbur Davenport (1920–2003), former engineer and scientist
Steve DeAngelo (born 1958), social activist
Katherine Drexel (1858–1955), former Roman Catholic saint
William Duane (1872–1935), former physicist
Daniel Faulkner (1955–1981), former Philadelphia police officer killed in the line of duty; Mumia Abu-Jamal was convicted of his murder
Christopher Ferguson (born 1961), former astronaut
Jacquelyn Frazier-Lyde (born 1961), Philadelphia municipal court judge and boxer
Barbara Harris (1930–2020), former Anglican Communion bishop
Paul B. Higginbotham (born 1954), judge, Wisconsin Court of Appeals
Ruth Malcomson (1906–1988), former Miss America
James Martin (born 1960), Jesuit priest, writer, and commentator on modern Catholicism
Seamus McCaffrey (born 1950), former justice, Supreme Court of Pennsylvania and presiding judge, "Eagles Court"
Carol McCain (c. 1938), ex-wife of U.S. presidential candidate John McCain
Silas Weir Mitchell (1829–1914), former physician, scientist, novelist, and poet considered father of neurology
Bawa Muhaiyaddeen (?–1986), Sufi mystic
 Clarence Charles Newcomer (1923–2005), former U.S. district judge, U.S. District Court for Eastern District of Pennsylvania 
John Joseph O'Connor (1920–2000), former Roman Catholic cardinal and archbishop, Archdiocese of New York
George A. Palmer (1895–1981), former clergyman and religious broadcaster
David L. Reich (born 1960), academic anesthesiologist, professor, Mount Sinai Hospital president
Marjorie Rendell (born 1947), former judge, U.S. Court of Appeals for the Third Circuit and First Lady of Pennsylvania
Amber Rose (born 1983), model and actress
Charles Sanna (1917–2019), former Swiss Miss creator), director
Samuel Gilbert Scott (c. 1813–1841), former daredevil
Lester Shubin (1925–2009), former inventor, Kevlar bulletproof vest
Nancy Spungen (1958–1978), girlfriend of Sex Pistols bassist Sid Vicious
Michael Tollin, film producer
Floyd W. Tomkins (1850–1932), former Church of the Holy Trinity, Philadelphia rector
Walter E. Williams (1936–2020), former economist, commentator, and academic
Jeremiah Wright (born 1941), former pastor Trinity United Church of Christ 
Joshua Wurman (born 1960), meteorologist and VORTEX2 leader

ReferencesReferences are on the article pages if not listed here.''

External links

 
Philadelphia
People
People